Diminuendo is a gradual decrease of loudness in music.

Diminuendo may also refer to:

 Diminuendo (album), by Lowlife
 Diminuendo (film), starring Richard Hatch
 Diminuendo (horse), 1988 winner of the Epsom Oaks